Newton-on-Ouse is a village and civil parish in the Hambleton District of North Yorkshire, England, about  north-west of York. It lies on the east bank of the River Ouse

History

The village is mentioned in the Domesday Book as Neuuetone in the Bulford hundred. At the time of the Norman invasion the manor was held by Merleswein the Sheriff and then granted to Ralph Paynel. He founded St Martin's Abbey in Touraine in France and granted some of the land in the parish to the abbey.

The village once had a school built in 1854 in Cherry Tree Avenue.

Governance

The village lies within the Thirsk and Malton Parliamentary constituency. It also lies within the Shipton ward of Hambleton District Council and the Stillington electoral division of North Yorkshire County Council.

Geography

The nearest settlements are Linton-on-Ouse  to the north-west, Nun Monkton  to the south-west and Beningbrough  to the south-east. The River Kyle runs through the parish to join the River Ouse at the north end of the village.

The 1881 UK Census recorded the population as 592. The 2001 UK Census recorded the population as 529, of which 431 were over the age of sixteen years and 269 of those were in employment. There were 242 dwellings, of which 11 were detached.

Religion 

There has been a church in Newton since Saxon times. Originally dedicated to All Saints it was known as St Mary's circa 1848-1890 before reverting to All Saints. The current Grade II Listed Building dates from 1849, although the Tower is approximately 900 years old. The church was rebuilt twice in the 19th Century, first in 1839 and then again in 1849. Both rebuilds were financed by the Dawnay family who resided at nearby Beningbrough Hall. John Oates was commissioned by the 6th Viscount Downe, William Henry Dawnay, to rebuild the body of the church and this was completed in 1839. Just ten years later Dawnay's daughter the Hon. Lydia Dawnay commission George Townsend Andrews to rebuild the church and it was at this stage that the magnificent spire, 150 ft from the ground, was added. William Dawnay, 6th Viscount Downe and his wife are interred in the church with the fine memorial brass that once covered the tomb now fixed to the Chancel wall. There used to be a Methodist Chapel in the village.
The Priest-in-Charge is Rev. Malcolm Wainwright.

References

External links 

 All Saints Church, Newton on Ouse
 All Saints Together - All Saints Church in Newton-on-Ouse

 
Villages in North Yorkshire
Civil parishes in North Yorkshire
Hambleton District